Lawn Bowls at the 2003 South Pacific Games was held from 28 June to 12 July 2003 in Suva, Fiji.

Men's results

Women's results

See also
 Lawn bowls at the Pacific Games

References

Lawn bowls at the Pacific Games
South Pacific Games